The Convocation (formerly The Convocation Of...) is an American psychedelic rock band from Baltimore, Maryland.

History
As The Convocation Of..., the band was formed by George France, Tonie Joy, and Guy Blakeslee in August 1998. Joy had previously played in the groups Moss Icon, Universal Order of Armageddon, The Great Unraveling, and Born Against.

Following their debut Lab Remix Series Vol. 3 EP, the group's self-titled debut album was released on Gold Standard Laboratories in 2000. A follow-up, Pyramid Technology, appeared on Tigerstyle Records in 2001.  In early 2002, Blakeslee left the group and founded The Entrance Band.  The Convocation Of... went on a hiatus.  

With Matthew Hall (formerly of The Red Scare) on bass, the band reunited under the name The Convocation in 2005.  Hall was replaced by Jason Stevens in 2008, and the group released a new EP on Gravity Records the next year.  Two years later, Stevens was replaced by bassist Chris Camden, who was replaced thereafter by Donny Van Zandt.

Members
Current members
Tonie Joy – guitar, vocals (1998–2002, 2005–present)
George France – drums (1998–2002, 2005–present)
Donny Van Zant – bass (2011–present)

Former members
Guy Blakeslee – bass (1998–2002)
Matthew Hall – bass (2005–2008)
Jason Stevens – bass (2008–2009)
Chris Camden – bass (2010)

Discography
Albums
The Convocation Of... (Gold Standard Laboratories, 2000)
Pyramid Technology (Tigerstyle Records, 2001)

EPs
Lab Remix Series Vol. 3 (Gold Standard Laboratories, 2000)
The Convocation (Gravity Records, 2009)

Splits
The Convocation/Chrissakes (Trans Ruin Records / One Percent Press, 2010)

References

American post-rock groups
Rock music groups from Maryland